The 2000 Supercopa de España was a Spanish football competition, played over two legs on 20 August and 27 August 2000. It was contested by Espanyol, who were Spanish Cup winners in 1999–2000, and Deportivo La Coruña, who won the 1999–2000 Spanish League.

Match details

First leg

Second leg

References

Supercopa de Espana Final
Supercopa de Espana 2000
Supercopa de Espana 2000
Supercopa de España
August 2000 sports events in Europe